Chaddesden is an electoral ward in the city of Derby, England.  The ward contains three listed buildings that are recorded in the National Heritage List for England.  Of these, one is listed at Grade I, the highest of the three grades, and the others are at Grade II, the lowest grade. The ward is a suburb to the east of the centre of the city and is largely residential.  The listed buildings consist of a church, a cottage and a war memorial.


Key

Buildings

References

Citations

Sources

 

Lists of listed buildings in Derbyshire
Listed buildings in Derby